is a passenger railway station in located in the city of  Kyōtango, Kyoto Prefecture, Japan, operated by the private railway company Willer Trains (Kyoto Tango Railway).

Lines
Kumihama Station is a station of the Miyazu Line, and is located 72.0 kilometers from the terminus of the line at Nishi-Maizuru Station.

Station layout
The station has one ground-level island platform and one ground-level side platform connected to the station building by a footbridge. The station is attended.

Platforms

Adjacent stations

History
The station was opened on December 15, 1929. The station building was reconstructed in 1991

Passenger statistics
In fiscal 2018, the station was used by an average of 82 passengers daily.

Surrounding area
 Kyōtango City Hall, Kumihama Government Building
 Former Kumihama Town Hall
 Kumihama Onsen
 Kyōtango City Kumihama Elementary School

See also
List of railway stations in Japan

References

External links

Official home page 

Railway stations in Kyoto Prefecture
Railway stations in Japan opened in 1929
Kyōtango